The 1995 Washington Redskins season was the franchise's 64th season in the National Football League. The team improved on their 3–13 record from 1994, but missed the playoffs for the third consecutive season.

Offseason

NFL Draft

Personnel

Staff

Roster

Regular season

Schedule

Standings

References 

Washington
Washington Redskins seasons
Red